The 2018 Selangor FA Season was Selangor FA's 13th season playing soccer in the Malaysia Super League since its inception in 2004.

Selangor FA began the season on 4 February 2018. They will also compete in two domestic cups, the Malaysia FA Cup and Malaysia Cup.

Season Overview

Pre-season 
(Squad build and first transfers)

On 16 November, Selangor squad manager, Abd Rauf Ahmad confirmed that P. Maniam will retain as Selangor's coach for 2018 season.

On 28 November, Ariffin Ab Hamid, manager of Selangor U21 squad confirmed that six players will be promoted to the first squad. Those players were Haziq Ridwan, Syukri Azman, Amirul Haziq, Tamil Maran, Azizul Baharuddin and D. Kugan.

During the pre-season planning, P.Maniam also added a few new local players for the season, such as Sean Selvaraj (Negeri Sembilan), Azamuddin Akil (Johor Darul Ta'zim), Ashmawi Yakin (Negeri Sembilan), Joseph Kalang Tie (Pahang) and Shahrul Igwan (Negeri Sembilan).

A few Selangor key players for the last season left the club including Adam Nor Azlin who joins Johor Darul Ta'zim as the first signing for the club since 2017 season end. Other transfers are Bunyamin Umar and Liberian Forkey Doe to Pahang, Raimi Mohd Nor, Fitri Shazwan and Nigerian Ugo Ukah to Penang who plays in second division, Rizal Fahmi to Negeri Sembilan, Zarif Irfan to PKNS, S. Veenod to Kelantan and star player, Indonesian Andik Vermansyah to Kedah.

In early December, Selangor signs for three new foreign players; young Indonesian players, Evan Dimas and Ilham Armaiyn, and a Brazilian defender Willian Pacheco.

Selangor announces its fifth signing on 28 January, Alfonso Cruz, another Spanish footballer in addition Rufino Segovia, who is retained from last season.

Pre-season and Friendlies Match 
Selangor first planned to go to Indonesia from 7 to 17 January for its pre-season campaign but it is cancelled for undisclosed reason.

On 30 December, Selangor began its pre-season with a match against ATM at Kementah Stadium, Kuala Lumpur. The game ends with 1-1 draw. The goal from Selangor is contributed by the Spanish footballer, Rufino Segovia.

In the next match against MISC-MIFA at USIM Mini Stadium in Negeri Sembilan, held on 5 January, Selangor suffers a big defeat with the final score 5-1 against Selangor. MISC-MIFA player, Kpah Sherman scores a hat-trick in the match while Selangor's goal is scored by its captain, Razman Roslan.

Selangor recorded its first win on 10 January during a match against Terengganu II at Sime Darby Football Complex at Bukit Jelutong with 1-0, with the single goal scored by Selangor veteran, Amri Yahyah.

Selangor final friendly match, against Korea Republic third-tier club Daejon Korail was scheduled on 26 January but due to bad weather, the match was postponed to the next morning. On the match played at National Sports Council pitch in Kuala Lumpur, Selangor won 3-1, with goals from Rufino Segovia, Tamil Maran and Faizzudin Abidin.

Overall, Selangor finishes the pre-season with 2 wins, 1 draw and 1 loss.

January 
Although Selangor had signed Evan Dimas and Ilham Armaiyn as early as December, Football Association of Indonesia (PSSI) does not allow them to join the rest of the team for their pre-season. On 4 January, Selangor president, Subahan Kamal had flown to Jakarta to meet Edy Rahmayadi, PSSI president to find a solution and understanding between the two bodies. The negotiation is successful as Edy finally grants permission to the two Indonesian players to join Selangor's camp following Selangor agreement to comply to PSSI demand in return, which is to allow them to report to the Indonesia national under-23 football team camp when they are called.

On 16 January, Football Association of Malaysia (FAM) President, Tunku Ismail releases a statement on the body official Facebook page that denies Selangor's application to use Bukit Jalil National Stadium as their home venue, citing that certain matches will collide with Malaysia national football team's calendar as the stadium is also used by the national team as their homeground.

Following the rejection, Selangor approaches UiTM on 18 January in a bid to share their stadium but they were denied by the ground owner because of logistic and safety issues.

On 26 January, Selangor's vice-president, Abdul Rauf Ahmad confirmed that they had gained permission from Kuala Lumpur City Hall to use Kuala Lumpur Stadium as their venue and only waiting for official confirmation from FMLLP. On 30 January, it is reported that Kuala Lumpur president, Datuk Seri Adnan Md Ikhsan expressed his reluctance to share Kuala Lumpur stadium with Selangor this season because of the rivalries between the two teams. When he was asked to comment on his remarks, he told the reporters that he was joking and refused to comment on it further.

On 28 January, Selangor launches its kits for 2018 season. The launching ceremony was held at Plaza Alam Sentral, Shah Alam and was attended by hundreds of Red Giants fans.

February 
Selangor officially kicks off its 2018 Malaysia Super League campaign on 4 February 2018 with a highly anticipated Klang Valley Derby match against Kuala Lumpur. Playing in their shared venue, Selangor played as away and claimed the title King of Klang Valley as they won the match 2-0, with both goals from Rufino Segovia.

On 7 February, Selangor won 4-1 against Melaka United, with two goals each from Rufino Segovia and Syahmi Safari. The two consecutive wins allow Selangor to be on top of the league for the first two weeks.

On 10 February, Selangor suffers its first lost at Sultan Ismail Nasiruddin Shah Stadium in a match against Terengganu. The final score is 1-4 to Terengganu as Selangor's only goal from Amri Yahyah came late at the 89th minute.

On 11 February, Selangor announces its collaboration with local musician, Monoloque, to produce a new anthem song for the football team in a pre-launch event.

After a week Chinese New Year break, Selangor comes back on 24 February only to lose against Pahang 1-3 on their own homeground. Selangor's goal was contributed once again by Rufino Segovia making him the team topscorer, as he had scored 5 goals for Selangor so far.

March 
On 1 March, Football Association of Malaysia's referees committee chairman, Subkhiddin Mohd Salleh announced that two referees from Selangor's match against Pahang FA on 24 February will be suspended for two weeks following the controversial penalty given to Pahang's side. During the match, Selangor's defender Willian Pacheco commits a hand ball outside the penalty box but a penalty was awarded despite Selangor's objection.

Selangor starts its campaign in the FA Cup in the second round match against MOF on 4 March, following a first round bye. They won with 3-0, with a goal each from Amri Yahyah, Rufino Segovia and Syahmi Safari.

Following a statement released by Football Malaysia Limited Liability Partnership (FMLLP) on 19 February where Selangor was announced as one of the team failed to submit their registration document on time, on 7 March FMLLP announced that Selangor will have to pay RM 1.5 mil fine for the offense.

On 11 March, Selangor faces their third defeat in a row in the Super League, this time against rival Perak with 3-0 to Perak. This result had spark anger from the fans that pushes for coach P. Maniam to be fired. On 14 March, Selangor announces that Maniam had been rested and the assistant coach, Nazliazmi Mohd Nasir will takeover as a caretaker coach while Selangor finds a suitable candidate to replace the coach.

The next game was held on 14 March, against Terengganu. It was the first game played by Selangor after the changing in coaching staff. In the third round match of FA Cup, Selangor won 3-1. The goals was contributed by Amri Yahyah, Willian Pacheco and Evan Dimas.

May
On 31 May 2018, the departing president, Subahan Kamal confirmed that Tengku Amir Shah will replace him as the football association's president after he left the sports body.

July
Tengku Amir officially became the president of Selangor FA after receiving 81 nominations from 96 affiliates and won uncontested in the extraordinary congress that was held on 3 July 2018. He stated that his goal as the new president is to make FA Selangor self-sustaining and become a commercially viable club. He aimed for the club to be able to not rely on state funding in five years.

November
On 3 November 2018, a group of individuals called an Extraordinary Congress (EC) to elect new executive committee, citing that the appointment of several committee members are not lawful, including the position of several vice-presidents. The subsequent re-election showed total change in all posts, barring Tengku Amir who was re-elected as the president. However, Tengku Amir later declared that the EC was invalid since it does not followed the proper procedure. It was also held without his consent and was not recognised by him and the association. This was supported by the Football Association of Malaysia president, Hamidin Amin, who said that Tengku Amir is still the president of FAS and the congress was invalid as it was held without the president's consent. Tengku Amir called the rogue faction to meet him at the palace to voice out their displeasure but only less than half of them attended it. As a result, he removed 43 affiliate clubs from the association, stating that they no longer hold the same values and dreams as FA Selangor. The announcement was made through FAS social media accounts on 15 December 2018.

Kit
Supplier: Lotto / Sponsor: redONE

Players

First Team Squad

Reserve Team Squad (call-up)

Transfers

First Transfers
20 November 2017 – 11 February 2018

Transfers in

Transfers out

Pre-season and friendlies

Selangor FA friendlies

Friendly Match 1

Friendly Match 2

Friendly Match 3

Friendly Match 4

Competitions

Overall

Overview

Malaysia Super League

Table

Results summary

Results by round

Fixtures and Results

Results overview

FA Cup

Quarter-finals

Semi-finals

Final

Malaysia Cup
Selangor joined the competition in the group stage.

Group stage

Statistics

Squad statistics
 

Appearances (Apps.) numbers are for appearances in competitive games only including sub appearances.\
Red card numbers denote: Numbers in parentheses represent red cards overturned for wrongful dismissal.

Goalscorers
Includes all competitive matches.

Clean sheets

Disciplinary record

References

Malaysian football clubs 2018 season
Selangor FA